Ascending branch of circumflex femoral artery can refer to:
 Ascending branch of lateral circumflex femoral artery (ramus ascendens arteriae circumflexae femoris lateralis)
 Ascending branch of medial circumflex femoral artery (ramus ascendens arteriae circumflexae femoris medialis)